The Fish River Canoe Marathon is a two-day event taking place on the Fish River in the Eastern Cape Province of South Africa. The two other notable South African canoe marathons are the Dusi Canoe Marathon and the Berg River Canoe Marathon.

The Fish River marathon first took place in 1982 with 77 competitors. It was the brainchild of Cape paddler Dave Alexander and a local Department of Water Affairs engineer, Knut Olav "KO" Bang. By 2000 competitor numbers had grown to a record 1564, placing the race among the world's five biggest canoe marathons.

The K-3, developed in South Africa, is a recent addition to the sprint kayak class which previously consisted of the K1, K2 and K4. The K3 is particularly well suited to the Fish River with a relatively rock-free river bed and easily negotiable weirs. Demonstrating this in 2009, Matt Bouman, Herman Chalupsky and Andrew Birkett paddled their K3 to a 5h 9m finish, coming in just outside the top 10 overall.

The 2011 overall winners were Hank McGregor/Grant van der Walt with a time of 4:40.38 for the 2-day event.

Winners

References

External links
Official website
Past winners
Facebook Photo Gallery

Canoeing and kayaking competitions in South Africa
Canoe marathon